Romy Simpkins (born 2 November 1993) is a British actress, model, Mental health ambassador and beauty pageant titleholder who competed in several beauty pageants. She has represented her country & the United Kingdom internationally in beauty pageants. She competed at the Miss International 2016 pageant in Tokyo, Japan. Romy competed in the Miss Supranational 2018 pageant in Krynica-Zdrój, Poland.

Pageantry

Miss Universe Great Britain 2012
Romy was a grand finalist for Miss Universe Great Britain 2012

Miss Dorset 2015 & Miss England 2015
She was crowned as Miss Dorset 2015, which she then went onto compete in the Miss England 2015 final.

Miss Global International UK 2015
She represented the UK at the Miss Global International 2015 pageant final in Trinidad and Tobago. She placed in the top 10, and with that received the Miss Photogenic award.

Miss Galaxy England 2016
Romy competed in the national Miss Galaxy England 2016 pageant final, in which she was placed as 2nd Runner-up.

Miss United Kingdom 2016
Simpkins was crowned Miss International United Kingdom 2016 as she competed at the UK Power Pageant 2016, which featured the crowning of 7 other national titles.

Miss International 2016
Romy represented United Kingdom at Miss International 2016 but Unplaced.

Miss Universe Great Britain 2018
She was awarded a space in the grand final of Miss Universe GB pageant in 2018.

Miss Supranational England 2018
Romy represented England at the Miss Supranational 2018 Pageant in Poland.

Miss Intercontinental UK 2020/21
She is now a current finalist of Miss Intercontinental UK. In hope of being crowned a part of team UK for the Miss Intercontinental international pageant.

Television & Modelling
Romy has starred in many Television & Film productions including series 6 of Dinner Date as well as had an extra role in the film 'One Day'. Romy also featured in the 02 "Whats my street age" advert on facebook. When she was in Australia, She was selected as 'Face of the Month' by EMPV Model & Talent Management Company. Romy is also an assigned part-time model, her work involved beauty, commercial and bridal. Romy was selected as a Jovani It Girl Semi-finalist in 2016.

References

External links

Living people
People from Bournemouth
1993 births
English female models
Miss International 2016 delegates
21st-century English women
21st-century English people